Limitless is a 2011 American science-fiction thriller film directed by Neil Burger and written by Leslie Dixon. Based on the 2001 novel The Dark Fields by Alan Glynn, the film stars Bradley Cooper, Abbie Cornish, Robert De Niro, Andrew Howard, and Anna Friel. The film follows Edward Morra, a struggling writer who is introduced to a nootropic drug called NZT-48, which gives him the ability to use his brain fully and to improve his lifestyle vastly.
Limitless was released on March 18, 2011, and became a box-office success, grossing over $161 million on a budget of $27 million. A television series of the same name, covering events that take place after the film, debuted on September 22, 2015, but was cancelled after one season.

Plot 
Eddie Morra is a struggling author in New York City. His girlfriend Lindy, frustrated with his lack of progress (as well as his seeming lack of ambition, motivation, and focus), breaks up with him. Eddie encounters Vernon, the brother of his ex-wife Melissa, who gives him a sample of a new nootropic called NZT-48, which Vernon implies will help Eddie with his "creative problems". On the drug, Eddie discovers that he has acquired perfect recall, and is able to analyze minute details and information at incredible speed. As the pill takes effect, he is being yelled at by his landlord's wife. With his new power, he calms her down, helps her with her law school homework, and sleeps with her. His abilities compel him to tidy up his apartment and give him immense inspiration for his book.

Soon afterwards, Vernon is murdered by someone searching for the drug. Eddie locates Vernon's supply and takes increasing doses. As his life improves, he decides to begin investing in the stock market. He is hired at a brokerage firm and resumes his relationship with Lindy. His success leads to a meeting with finance tycoon Carl Van Loon, who tests him by seeking advice on a merger with Hank Atwood's company. After the meeting, Eddie experiences an 18-hour loss of memory, which he refers to as a "time skip". The next day in a meeting with Van Loon, Eddie sees a news telecast that a woman has been murdered in her hotel room. Eddie recognizes her as the woman he slept with during his time skip and abruptly leaves the meeting.

Eddie realizes that everyone taking NZT-48 is either hospitalized or dead. A man in a trench coat is revealed to have been following him. Lindy tells Eddie she cannot be with him while he is on the drug. Eddie experiments with NZT-48 and learns to control his dosage, sleep schedule, and food intake to prevent side effects. He hires a laboratory in an attempt to reverse-engineer the drug, an attorney to keep the police from investigating the death of Vernon or the woman, and two bodyguards to protect him from Gennady, a loan shark, who is threatening him to obtain more NZT-48.

On the day of the merger, Atwood falls into a coma. Eddie recognizes Atwood's driver as the man in the trench coat and realizes Atwood is on NZT-48. While Eddie participates in a police lineup, his attorney steals Eddie's supply of pills from his jacket pocket. Eddie enters into withdrawal, and while Van Loon questions him about Atwood's coma, Eddie receives a parcel that is found to contain the severed hands of his bodyguards. He hurries home and locks himself in, before Gennady breaks into Eddie's apartment, demanding more NZT-48. Gennady flaunts his abilities while injecting himself with NZT-48, explaining that by injecting it directly into the bloodstream, the effects last longer and the withdrawal symptoms are lessened. As Gennady threatens to eviscerate him, Eddie grabs his own knife and kills Gennady. Eddie then consumes Gennady's blood to ingest the NZT-48 in the blood. This gives Eddie the mental abilities of the drug once again, and he is able to kill the remaining henchmen. He then meets with the man in the trench coat, surmising that Atwood employed the man to locate more NZT-48. Once Atwood dies, the two recover Eddie's stash from his attorney's apartment.

A year later, Eddie has retained his wealth, published a book, and is running for the United States Senate. Van Loon visits him and reveals that he has absorbed the company that produced NZT-48 and shut down Eddie's laboratory and both acknowledge that Eddie will likely become President of the United States one day, so Van Loon offers Eddie a continued supply of the drug in exchange for Eddie assisting his ambitions. Eddie tells Van Loon that he has already perfected the drug and weaned himself off of it, retaining his abilities without side effects.

Eddie goes to lunch with Lindy. After speaking Chinese to the waiter, Lindy looks at Eddie, wondering if he's really off NZT. He looks at Lindy and says "What?"

Cast

Production
Limitless is based on the novel The Dark Fields by Alan Glynn. The film is directed by Neil Burger, and is based on a screenplay by Leslie Dixon, who had acquired rights to the source material. Dixon wrote the adapted screenplay for less than her regular price in exchange for being made one of the film's producers. Fellow producer Scott Kroopf and she approached Burger to direct the film, at the time titled The Dark Fields. For Burger, who had written and directed his previous three films, the collaboration was his first foray solely as director. With Universal Pictures developing the project, Shia LaBeouf was announced in April 2008 to be cast as the film's star.

The project eventually moved to development under Relativity Media and Sir Richard Branson's Virgin Produced with Universal distributing through Relativity's Rogue Pictures. By November 2009, Bradley Cooper replaced LaBeouf in the starring role. Robert De Niro was cast opposite Cooper by March 2010, and The Dark Fields began filming in Philadelphia the following May. Filming also took place in New York City. For a scene filmed in Puerto Vallarta, filmmakers sought a luxury car. Italian carmaker Maserati provided two Maserati GranTurismo coupes free in "a guerrilla-style approach" to product placement. By December 2010, The Dark Fields was re-titled Limitless.

The film notably incorporates fractal zooming, jump-cutting, and out-of-body scenes to convey the effect of the wonder drug on the protagonist. Green screens and motion-control photography were used to produce the visual effect of characters performing an action, and then turning around to see themselves doing that action again. The opening scene was created with still photographs stitched together using a variety of special-effects techniques.

Release

The film grossed $18.9 million on its opening weekend to rank first at the box office, beating other openers The Lincoln Lawyer and Paul, as well as carryovers Rango and Battle: Los Angeles.

Before the film's release, Box Office Mojo called Limitless a "wild card", highlighting its "clearly articulated" premise and the pairing of Cooper and De Niro, but questioned a successful opening. The film opened at number one in its first week in the U.S. The film did well at the box office, earning some $79 million in the U.S. and Canada, as well as some $157 million worldwide against its $27 million budget.

Reception 
On review aggregator website Rotten Tomatoes, Limitless has an approval rating of 69% based on 199 reviews, with an average rating of 6.4/10. The site's critical consensus reads, "Although its script is uneven, Neil Burger directs Limitless with plenty of visual panache, and Bradley Cooper makes for a charismatic star." Metacritic assigned the film a weighted average score of 59 out of 100, based on 37 critics, indicating "mixed or average reviews". Audiences polled by CinemaScore gave the film an average grade of "B+" on an A+ to F scale.

Roger Ebert of the Chicago Sun-Times gave the film 2.5 out of 4 stars and said it was "not terrifically good, but the premise is intriguing" and also stated that director Neil Burger uses "inventive visual effects." Lastly, adapting a line from the movie, he said, "Limitless only uses 15, maybe 20 percent of its brain. Still, that's more than a lot of movies do."

Kirk Honeycutt of The Hollywood Reporter wrote, "Limitless should be so much smarter than it is," believing that it took conventional plot turns and stuck closely to genre elements like Russian gangsters and Wall Street crooks. Honeycutt reserved praise for Cooper, Abbie Cornish, and Anna Friel. He also commended cinematographer Jo Willems' camerawork and Patrizia von Brandenstein's production design in the film's array of locales.

Varietys Robert Koehler called Limitless a "propulsive, unexpectedly funny thriller". Koehler wrote, "What makes the film so entertaining is its willingness to go far out, with transgressive touches and mind-bending images that take zoom and fish-eye shots to a new technical level, as the pill enables Eddie to experience astonishing new degrees of clarity, perception, and energy." He said of Cooper's performance, "Going from grungy to ultrasuave with a corresponding shift in attitude, Cooper shows off his range in a film he dominates from start to finish. The result is classic Hollywood star magnetism, engaging auds [audiences] physically and vocally, as his narration proves to be a crucial element of the pic's humor." The critic also positively compared Willems' cinematography to the style in Déjà Vu (2006) and commended the tempo set by the film's editors Naomi Geraghty and Tracy Adams and by composer Paul Leonard-Morgan.

Limitless received the award for Best Thriller at the 2011 Scream Awards and was nominated for Best Science Fiction Film at the 2012 Saturn Awards, but lost to Rise of the Planet of the Apes.

Limitless has been discussed in academic scholarly debates, notably on human enhancement.

TV spin-off

Bradley Cooper announced in October 2013 that Leslie Dixon, Scott Kroopf, and he  would be executive producers of a television series based on Limitless. On November 3, 2014, CBS announced it would be financing a pilot episode for the Limitless TV series. The pilot continued where the film left off. The main character would be called Brian Finch.

The Limitless pilot was directed by Marc Webb, replacing Burger, who had to pull out because of a scheduling conflict with the Showtime drama pilot Billions. Burger is still an executive producer, along with Alex Kurtzman, Roberto Orci, and Heather Kadin. It is based on a script by Elementary executive producer Craig Sweeny. The Limitless pilot was screen-tested on June 1, 2015, with Jake McDorman, Jennifer Carpenter, Hill Harper, and Mary Elizabeth Mastrantonio starring.

Limitless officially got a series order in May 2015. The show was announced as a spin-off of the film, before confirming that Bradley Cooper would make regular appearances, reprising his role as Edward Morra.

The TV show premiered on CBS on September 22, 2015, with a 1.9 rating.

On May 25, 2016, Craig Sweeny announced the series had been cancelled after one season.

See also
 Flowers for Algernon, 1959 short story and 1966 novel
 Charly, 1968 film based on "Flowers for Algernon"
 Intellectual giftedness
 Lucy, 2014 film about a similar nootropic drug, CPH4
 Phenomenon, 1996 film
  The Lawnmower Man, 1992 film
 The Power, 1968 film
 Posthuman
 Transhumanist stories in television and film
 "Understand", 1991 novelette by Ted Chiang, nominated for the 1992 Hugo Award for Best Novelette, and winner of the 1992 Asimov's Reader Poll.

References

External links

 
 
 A 'Limitless' memory? It may not be a good thing at MSNBC
 Pseudo Web site about NZT as if it was a real product

2011 films
American science fiction thriller films
2010s science fiction thriller films
Films about drugs
Films set in New York City
Films directed by Neil Burger
Films scored by Paul Leonard-Morgan
Films shot in New York City
Films about psychic powers
Relativity Media films
Rogue (company) films
Films about writers
Films adapted into television shows
Films based on Irish novels
Trading films
Smart drugs in fiction
Films shot in Philadelphia
Films shot in Mexico
Films with screenplays by Leslie Dixon
Transhumanism in film
Films produced by Scott Kroopf
2010s English-language films
2010s American films